Arends is a Dutch and Low German patronymic surname, meaning "son of Arend". It may refer to:

 Brett Arends (born 1968), American business journalist
 Carolyn Arends (born 1968), Canadian singer-songwriter
 Georg Arends (1863–1952), German botanist and gardener
 Henri Arends (1921–1993), Dutch conductor
 Isabel Arends (born 1966), Dutch chemist
 Jacco Arends (born 1991), Dutch badminton player
 Jan Arends (1738–1805), Dutch landscape and marine painter
 Leopold Arends (1817–1882), German stenographer
 Leslie C. Arends (1895–1985), American (Illinois) politician
 Richard Arends (born 1990), Dutch footballer
 Sander Arends (born 1991), Dutch tennis player

See also 
 Arents, Dutch and German surname of the same origin
 Arend (disambiguation)
 Ahrendt and Ahrendts, German surnames
 Ahrens (disambiguation), German surname
 Arent, Dutch and German given name and surname 
 Arent Arentsz (1585–1631), Dutch painter

References 

Dutch-language surnames
Patronymic surnames